The Banner Saga 3 is a tactical role-playing video game developed by Stoic Studio and published by Versus Evil for macOS, Microsoft Windows, Nintendo Switch, PlayStation 4, and Xbox One. It is the final installment in a trilogy of games that began with The Banner Saga (2014) and The Banner Saga 2 (2016).

Gameplay
The Banner Saga 3 is a tactical role-playing video game featuring turn-based combat. The themes of the game are inspired by Viking culture.

Development and release
The Banner Saga 3 was developed by Stoic, a studio founded by former BioWare employees. Following the release of 2016's The Banner Saga 2, Stoic expressed interest in creating a third instalment, noting that the fictional universe they created had plenty more storytelling opportunities.  Speaking at the 2016 NASSCOM Game Developer Conference, Stoic co-founder John Watson, re-iterated their intention to complete The Banner Saga trilogy of games.  He estimated the budget required would be $2M, and said that they had considered external funding.

In January 2017, The Banner Saga 3 was announced with the launch of a crowdfunding campaign on Kickstarter. The goal of $200,000 was achieved in less than a week, and the campaign concluded in March with $416,986 raised towards the game's development.  While the majority of the funding would still come from Stoic themselves, Watson said that the Kickstarter campaign would also create a community of enthusiastic testers.

The game was published by Versus Evil and was released on macOS, Windows, Nintendo Switch, PlayStation 4, and Xbox One.

Reception

The game received "generally favorable" reviews according to review aggregator Metacritic.

Awards

References

External links
 

2018 video games
Crowdfunded video games
Fantasy video games
Kickstarter-funded video games
MacOS games
Nintendo Switch games
PlayStation 4 games
PlayStation Network games
Tactical role-playing video games
Video games based on Norse mythology
Video games developed in the United States
Video games scored by Austin Wintory
Windows games
Xbox One games
Video games set in the Viking Age
Versus Evil games